Gustave Lanctot , also spelled Gustave Lanctôt, (5 July 1883 – 2 February 1975) was a Canadian historian and archivist.

Born in Saint-Constant, Quebec, he studied law at Université de Montréal and was called to the Quebec Bar in 1907. A Rhodes Scholar, he studied political science and history from 1909 to 1911 while at Oxford University. He was also a member of the Oxford Canadians ice hockey team. In 1912, he joined the National Archives of Canada. During World War I, he served in the Canadian Expeditionary Force.

After the war, he received a PhD from the Sorbonne and later returned to the National Archives eventually becoming Dominion Archivist from 1937 to 1948. He also taught at the University of Ottawa.

A historian, he wrote many books including L'Administration de la Nouvelle-France (1929), Le Canada d'hier et d'aujourd'hui (1934), Montréal au temps de la Nouvelle-France, 1642-1760 (1942), Trois ans de guerre, 1939-1942 (1943), L'Oeuvre de la France en Amérique du Nord (1951), Histoire du Canada (winner of the 1963 Governor General's Award for French language non-fiction), Le Canada et la Révolution américaine (1965, and winner of the inaugural Albert B. Corey Prize in 1967) and Montréal sous Maisonneuve, 1947-1965 (1966). He also was a historical advisor on eight Canadian films produced from 1961 to 1964.

He was made a Fellow of the Royal Society of Canada in 1926, was awarded the J. B. Tyrrell Historical Medal, and was its president from 1948 to 1949. On July 6, 1967, he was one of the first people to be made an Officer of the Order of Canada (then called a Service Medal). The citation read "Renowned historian whose "Histoire du Canada" marks the culmination of a life devoted to knowledge of Canada's past". He also was made a Knight of the Légion d'honneur.

Order of Canada medal auction
In late 2006 and early 2007, Lanctot made the news concerning his Order of Canada medal which was put up for auction on eBay. It was later removed since the auction is against eBay rules. However, the auction appeared to proceed via e-mail.

References

 Fonds Gustave Lanctôt at Library and Archives Canada 
 Fonds Gustave-Lanctot at the University of Ottawa 
 Biographies of Prominent Quebec and Canadian Historical Figures: Gustave Lanctot
 Order of Canada citation
 Order of Cda. medal auction to proceed by e-mail

External links
 

1883 births
1975 deaths
Canadian archivists
20th-century Canadian civil servants
Canadian male non-fiction writers
Canadian Rhodes Scholars
Canadian military personnel of World War I
Fellows of the Royal Society of Canada
Officers of the Order of Canada
Writers from Quebec
Université de Montréal alumni
Academic staff of the University of Ottawa
University of Paris alumni
Governor General's Award-winning non-fiction writers
Canadian writers in French
Chevaliers of the Légion d'honneur
People from Saint-Constant, Quebec
20th-century Canadian historians
Winners of the Prix Broquette-Gonin (literature)
Presidents of the Canadian Historical Association
Canadian King's Counsel